Valkeala is a former municipality of Finland.

It is located in the province of Southern Finland, and is a neighborhood of city of Kouvola, and it was a part of the Kymenlaakso region. The municipality had a population of 11,238 (2003) and covered an area of 1,004.40 km² of which 143.47 km² was water. The population density was 13.1 inhabitants per km².

In the Valkeala region there is the lake Vekaranjärvi near which the Karelia Brigade is located.

Valkeala is famous for Repovesi National Park.

The municipality was unilingually Finnish.

As of 2009, the six municipalities – Kouvola, Kuusankoski, Elimäki, Anjalankoski, Valkeala and Jaala – were consolidated, accounting for the new municipality of Kouvola with a population of over 80,000, being the 10th largest city in Finland.

People born in Valkeala
Anton Suurkonka (1886 – 1964)
Paavo Karjalainen (1904 – 1978)
Arvo Askola (1909 – 1975)
Kauko Andersson (1913 – 1979)
Heikki Hykkäälä (1914 – 1995)
Sulo Suorttanen (1921 – 2005)
Markku Laukkanen (1950 – )
Sari Palm (1966 – )
Tuomas Kansikas (1981 – )
Visa Hongisto (1987 – )
Vili Sopanen (1987 — )
Sami Tamminen (1997 — )

Populated places disestablished in 2009
2009 disestablishments in Finland
Former municipalities of Finland
Kouvola